Reverse is a 2017 South Korean television series starring Shin Da-eun, Lee Jae-hwang, Kim Hae-in, and Seo Do-young. The series aired daily on MBC TV from 7:50 a.m. to 8:30 a.m. (KST) starting from November 13, 2017 and ending till April 26, 2018.

Synopsis
After experiencing the bankruptcy and sudden death of her father, sudden disappearance of boyfriend Joon-hee and younger brother Jae-min faced huge difficulties, interior designer Kim In-yeon discovered that all of the misfortunes came from Taeyang Group. From that day, she decided to take revenge on those who created misfortune to her family.

Cast

Main
 Shin Da-eun as Kim In-yeong
Soo Kyung's daughter. Jae-min's older sister. Designer.
Lee Jae-hwang as Kang Dong-bin
Kim Hae-in as Chae Yoo-ran
Seo Do-young as Kang Joon-hee

Supporting

People around In-young
Lee Eung-kyung as Yang Soo-kyung
In-young and Jae-min's mother.
Ji Eun-sung as Kim Jae-min
In-young's younger brother. Soo-kyung's son
So Hee-jung as Hong Cho-hee

People around Dong-bin
Jung Sung-mo as Kang Baek-san
Jung Ae-ri as Yeo Hyang-mi

People around Yoo-ran
Nam Myung-ryul

Others
Lee Hyun-gul
Lim Do-yoon as Gong da-mi
In-young's alter ego

Ratings
In this table,  represent the lowest ratings and  represent the highest ratings.
NR denotes that the drama did not rank in the top 20 daily programs on that date.
N/A denotes that the rating is not known.

Awards and nominations

Notes

References

External links
 

2017 South Korean television series debuts
2018 South Korean television series endings
Korean-language television shows
MBC TV television dramas
South Korean melodrama television series
Television series by MBC C&I